

Sota, Soota, Souta or SOTA may refer to:

People

, Japanese actor and vlogger
, Japanese professional shogi player
, Japanese actor
, Japanese footballer
, Japanese footballer
, Japanese football player
, Japanese football player
, Japanese footballer 
, Japanese track and field sprinter
, Japanese footballer
Sota Kitahara (born 2003), American soccer player 
, Japanese professional footballer 
, Japanese footballer 
, Japanese actor and voice actor
, Japanese football player
, Japanese ski jumper
, Japanese footballer
, Japanese sumo wrestler
, Japanese footballer
, Japanese figure skater

Fictional character
, character from the anime series Re:Creators
, character in the comics  Inuyasha
 Souta Mogami, character from the 2006 Japanese tokusatsu television series, GoGo Sentai Boukenger

Places
Common nickname for Minnesota
Sota, South Papua, a town in Merauke Regency, South Papua, Indonesia

SOTA Acronyms/Initialisms
State of the art
Summits On The Air, an awards program for radio amateurs operating from mountainous locations
School of the Arts (Rochester, New York)
San Francisco School of the Arts
Tacoma School of the Arts
School of the Air
Shroud of the Avatar: Forsaken Virtues
Software Over The Air, also known as over-the-air programming

Other 
Šota, a Serbian and Albanian dance
Sota (EP), a 1999 EP by Horna
SOTA Toys
Sota (playing card), the equivalent of the Jack or Knave in Spanish-suited playing cards.

Japanese masculine given names